Mülheim, officially Mülheim an der Ruhr and also described as "City on the River", is a city in North Rhine-Westphalia in Germany. It is located in the Ruhr Area between Duisburg, Essen, Oberhausen and Ratingen. It is home to many companies, especially in the food industry, such as the Aldi Süd Company, the Harke Group and the Tengelmann Group.

Mülheim received its town charter in 1808, and 100 years later the population exceeded 100,000, making Mülheim officially a city. At the time of the city's 200th anniversary with approximately 170,000 residents, it was counted among the smaller cities of Germany.

Geography

Geographical location
Mülheim an der Ruhr is located to the southwest of Essen in the Ruhr valley.

Geology

The northern foothills of the Rhenish Massif are characterised by the distinctive rock formation of the bare mountain slopes through which run coal-bearing layers which formed during the carboniferous period. Here the Ruhr cuts more than 50 meters deep into this Mittelgebirge. This natural erosion partly uncovered these mineable black coal deposits, which enabled their exploration and extraction using adits. However, the coal-rich layers became ever deeper as one progressed northward, which required setting up mines to extract the black coal. In contrast, the broad bayou (dead arm of a river) of Styrum borough is characteristic of the features of the Lower Rhine Plain.

Transport
The U18 metro line connects the city with Essen.

Politics

Mayor
The current Mayor of Mülheim is Marc Buchholz of the Christian Democratic Union (CDU) since 2020. The most recent mayoral election was held on 13 September 2020, with a runoff held on 27 September, and the results were as follows:

! rowspan=2 colspan=2| Candidate
! rowspan=2| Party
! colspan=2| First round
! colspan=2| Second round
|-
! Votes
! %
! Votes
! %
|-
| bgcolor=| 
| align=left| Marc Buchholz
| align=left| Christian Democratic Union
| 16,479
| 25.4
| 27,716
| 56.9
|-
| bgcolor=| 
| align=left| Monika Griefahn
| align=left| Social Democratic Party
| 16,385
| 25.3
| 20,984
| 43.1
|-
| bgcolor=| 
| align=left| Wilhelm Steitz
| align=left| Alliance 90/The Greens
| 10,178
| 15.7
|-
| bgcolor=| 
| align=left| Horst Bilo
| align=left| Independent
| 5,394
| 8.3
|-
| bgcolor=| 
| align=left| Jürgen Abeln
| align=left| Independent
| 4,907
| 7.6
|-
| bgcolor=| 
| align=left| Andreas Brings
| align=left| Die PARTEI
| 3,940
| 6.1
|-
| bgcolor=| 
| align=left| Alexander von Wrese
| align=left| Alternative for Germany
| 3,920
| 6.0
|-
| bgcolor=| 
| align=left| Amrei Debatin
| align=left| Free Democratic Party
| 1,853
| 2.9
|-
| bgcolor=| 
| align=left| Jochen Dirk Hartmann
| align=left| Independent
| 945
| 1.5
|-
| 
| align=left| Martin Ulrich Fritz
| align=left| Civic Awakening Mülheim
| 808
| 1.2
|-
! colspan=3| Valid votes
! 64,809
! 98.7
! 48,700
! 98.6
|-
! colspan=3| Invalid votes
! 879
! 1.3
! 679
! 1.4
|-
! colspan=3| Total
! 65,688
! 100.0
! 49,379
! 100.0
|-
! colspan=3| Electorate/voter turnout
! 130,571
! 50.3
! 130,561
! 37.8
|-
| colspan=7| Source: State Returning Officer
|}

City council

The Mülheim city council governs the city alongside the Mayor. The most recent city council election was held on 13 September 2020, and the results were as follows:

! colspan=2| Party
! Votes
! %
! +/-
! Seats
! +/-
|-
| bgcolor=| 
| align=left| Christian Democratic Union (CDU)
| 16,970
| 26.3
|  0.9
| 14
|  1
|-
| bgcolor=| 
| align=left| Alliance 90/The Greens (Grüne)
| 15,097
| 23.4
|  12.4
| 13
|  7
|-
| bgcolor=| 
| align=left| Social Democratic Party (SPD)
| 13,765
| 21.3
|  10.2
| 12
|  5
|-
| bgcolor=| 
| align=left| Alternative for Germany (AfD)
| 4,629
| 7.2
|  1.9
| 4
|  1
|-
| 
| align=left| Mülheimer Citizens' Initiative (MBI)
| 3,043
| 4.7
|  5.4
| 3
|  2
|-
| bgcolor=| 
| align=left| Free Democratic Party (FDP)
| 3,003
| 4.7
|  0.7
| 3
| ±0
|-
| bgcolor=| 
| align=left| Die PARTEI (PARTEI)
| 2,866
| 4.4
| New
| 2
| New
|-
| bgcolor=| 
| align=left| The Left (Die Linke)
| 1,751
| 2.7
|  1.4
| 1
|  1
|-
| 
| align=left| We From Mülheim (WIR)
| 1,560
| 2.4
|  1.0
| 1
| ±0
|-
| 
| align=left| Civic Awakening Mülheim (BAMH)
| 1,173
| 1.8
| New
| 1
| New
|-
| colspan=7 bgcolor=lightgrey| 
|-
| 
| align=left| Alliance for Education (BüfBi)
| 424
| 0.7
|  0.3
| 0
|  1
|-
| bgcolor=| 
| align=left| Independents
| 226
| 0.4
| –
| 0
| –
|-
! colspan=2| Valid votes
! 64,507
! 98.3
! 
! 
! 
|-
! colspan=2| Invalid votes
! 1,144
! 1.7
! 
! 
! 
|-
! colspan=2| Total
! 65,651
! 100.0
! 
! 54
! ±0
|-
! colspan=2| Electorate/voter turnout
! 130,571
! 50.3
!  0.0
! 
! 
|-
| colspan=7| Source: State Returning Officer
|}

Twin towns – sister cities

Mülheim an der Ruhr is twinned with:

 Darlington, England, UK (1953)
 Tours, France (1962)
 Opole, Poland (1989)
 Kfar Saba, Israel (1993)
 Beykoz, Turkey (2007)
 Kouvola, Finland (2009)

Notable sports clubs
1. FC Mülheim (founded 1923), a football club
VfB Speldorf (founded 1919), a football club
HTC Uhlenhorst Mülheim (founded 1920), a field hockey club

Notable companies
Plus (founded 1972), a supermarket chain
Tengelmann (founded 1867), a holding company
Aldi Süd Company (founded 1946 (split in two parts in 1960, renamed to Aldi Nord and Aldi Süd in 1962)), a discount supermarket chains

Notable people

Wilhelm Rittenhausen (1644–1708), founder of the first paper mill in North America
Gerhard Tersteegen (1697–1769), Reformed religious writer
Carl Arnold Kortum (1745–1824), physician, writer and poet
August Bungert (1845–1915), opera composer and poet
Wilibald Nagel (1863–1929), musicologist
Hugo Stinnes (1870–1924), industrialist and founder of the German People's Party
Fritz Thyssen (1873–1951), industrialist associated with the Nazi Party
Carl Otto von Eicken (1873–1960), otorhinolaryngologist
Heinrich Thyssen (1875–1947), German-Hungarian entrepreneur and art collector
Arthur Kaufmann (1888–1971), painter
Walter Hartmann (1891–1977), general of artillery in World War II
Otto Pankok (1893–1966), painter, printmaker and sculptor
Otto Roelen (1897–1993), chemist
Karl Ziegler (1898–1973), chemist, Nobel Prize winner
Clärenore Stinnes (1901–1990), car racer, the first person to circumnavigate the world by automobile
Werner Best (1903–1989), jurist, police chief and Nazi leader
Carl Balhaus (1905–1968), actor and director
Fritz Buchloh (1909–1998), footballer
Günther Smend (1912–1944), officer and a resistance fighter involved in the July 20 Plot to assassinate Adolf Hitler
Johannes Bölter (1915–1987), German Army tank commander during World War II
Karl Albrecht (1920–2014), entrepreneur, Aldi founder
Theo Albrecht (1922–2010), entrepreneur, Aldi founder
Wilhelm Knabe (1923–2021), ecologist, pacifist, civil servant, politician and co-founder of the Green Party in Germany
Wim Thoelke (1927–1995), TV entertainer
Hermann Bottenbruch (1928–2019), mathematician and computer scientist
Jürgen Sundermann (born 1940), football player and manager
Hans Walitza (born 1945), football player and manager
Rudolf Seliger (born 1951), footballer
Bodo Hombach (born 1952), politician (SPD)
Monika Griefahn (born 1954), politician (SPD)
Hans-Günter Bruns (born 1954), footballer
Helge Schneider (born 1955), comedian, musician, author, film and theatre director and actor
Ralph Morgenstern (born 1956), television presenter and actor
Albrecht von Croÿ (born 1958), journalist
Ulla Kock am Brink (born 1961), television presenter
Hannelore Kraft (born 1961), politician (SPD) and Minister-President of North Rhine-Westphalia
Ralf Lübke (born 1965), athlete
Carolin Emcke (born 1967), journalist
Willi Landgraf (born 1968), footballer
Sven Meinhardt (born 1971), field hockey player, Olympic winner
André Lenz (born 1973), footballer
Lars Burgsmüller (born 1975), tennis player
Marion Rodewald (born 1976), field hockey player, Olympic winner
Kai Gehring (born 1977), politician
Felix Erdmann (born 1978), rowing cox
Simone Hanselmann (born 1979), actress
Salih Altın (born 1987), footballer
Bobby Gunns (born 1992), professional wrestler
Jonathan Rommelmann (born 1994), Olympic medalist
Stephanie Stebich (born 1966), art historian

Gallery

See also

Mülheim Hauptbahnhof

References

External links

 Official city homepage

 
Cities in North Rhine-Westphalia
1808 establishments in Germany
Districts of the Rhine Province